Key to the World or variants may refer to:

The Key of the World, 1918 British silent romance film directed by J.L.V. Leigh 
Key to the World, play by Doug Lucie
Keys to the World, album by English singer-songwriter Richard Ashcroft 2006
"Key to the World", song by Little Son Joe dedicated to Memphis Minnie
"Key to the Word", a song from A New Day (Four Letter Lie album)